Nes Castra was a Bosnian commercial radio station, broadcasting from Banja Luka from 2007 until 23 July 2018.

Formatted as Urban radio, Nes Castra it was intended for the local audience in Banja Luka at single frequency . Its sister station was Nes radio.

References

External links 
 Official website Nes Castra
 Communications Regulatory Agency of Bosnia and Herzegovina

See also 
List of radio stations in Bosnia and Herzegovina

Defunct radio stations
Radio stations in Bosnia and Herzegovina
Radio stations established in 2007
Radio stations disestablished in 2018
Mass media in Banja Luka
Defunct mass media in Bosnia and Herzegovina